Md Shahidullah (1963/1964 – 25 July, 2020) was a Brigadier General of Bangladesh Army and former Director of Central Medical Store Depot.

Career 
Shahidullah served in the Bangladesh Army medical corp. He was an orthopedic and spine surgeon. He had served as the Deputy Director General of Medical Services in the Directorate General of Medical Services of Bangladesh Armed Forces.

Shahidullah served as the Director of Central Medical Store Depot. He was replaced after a scandal involving the supply of fake N95 masks on 23 May 2020. He had threatened to sue newspapers that named Minister of Health and Family Welfare Zahid Maleque, Maleque's son, secretary Md Ashadul Islam, and Director General  of Directorate General of Health Services Abul Kalam Azad. He was recalled back to Bangladesh Army headquarters. He was replaced by Abu Hena Morshed Zaman. He blamed a section of employees of the Ministry of Health and Family Welfare. After which he wrote a letter to the secretary of public administration on 30 May 2020; in which he requested that the Ministry of Health and Family Welfare to be made syndicate free. He made accusations about Mithu syndicate, led by Motazzaroul Islam Mithu, controlling the public procurement in the healthcare sector in Bangladesh.

Death 
Shahidullah died on 25 July 2020 from COVID-19 in the Combined Military Hospital.

References 

Bangladesh Army generals
2020 deaths
Deaths from the COVID-19 pandemic in Bangladesh